is a 1995 fighting arcade game developed and published by ADK with the assistance of SNK. It was originally released for the Neo Geo MVS arcade cabinet on May 25, 1995.  It is the fourth and final title of the World Heroes series.

Gameplay

In World Heroes Perfect, each character had a traditional four-button attack layout instead of the two-out-of-three pressure-sensing button attack layout as its predecessors, but also could achieve stronger attacks by pushing down two respective punch or kick buttons at the same time. Players are also able to perform weak or strong versions of special moves depending on whether they press one or both punch or kick buttons with the special move command.

New additions include a few new playable characters, as well as new and modified moves and fighting statistics added to the playable characters returning from the first three World Heroes titles. Other new features are that every character has an ABC Special Move (or "special ability") that can be activated by pressing the A, B, and C buttons at the same time. Moves vary by character, though they all require strategic use and are easy to activate, allowing for more tactical battles. For example, the character Fuuma's ABC Special allows him to fake a special move; J. Max's ABC Special allows him to catch, hold onto, and throw back projectiles; and Kim Dragon's ABC Special allows him to perform counters while blocking. Characters also can use the strongest versions of their desperation moves whenever their life bars are under 50%.

All modes from the previous titles were excluded in this version; however, the main mode is similar to the "Normal Game" modes of World Heroes and World Heroes 2, as well as the "Entry to the tournament" mode of World Heroes 2 Jet. At the start of World Heroes Perfect in the main mode, after selecting one of the sixteen playable characters (plus three unlockable ones using codes), the object is to first face several of the playable characters selected by random and fight them in random stages that take place in different historical periods. After defeating ten characters, the player will then face off against Zeus and Neo Dio. If the player defeats Neo Dio, they will be able to see their selected character's ending.

Plot
One year after both the conclusion of the World Heroes Battle Fest and the defeat of Zeus, invitations has been sent to the 16 fighters by Dr. Brown, informing them of a new World Heroes tournament that will help finally settle the question of who is the strongest fighter in history. With the 16 fighters preparing themselves in order to finally determine who is the strongest fighter in history, Zeus seeks to gain his revenge against those who had caused his downfall, but little does Zeus and the rest of the fighters know and realize that an old enemy from the past is also back and that he too has his own personal desire for revenge as well.

Ports and related releases
World Heroes Perfect was ported to the Neo Geo AES in both Japan and North America on June 30, 1995. Like most AES versions of Neo Geo titles, it is the same as the Neo Geo MVS version. This version was added to the Wii's Virtual Console in Japan on January 11, 2011, in North America on July 26, 2012 and in the PAL region on October 18, 2012. World Heroes Perfect was ported and published in Japan by ADK to the Neo Geo CD on July 21, 1995, and published in North America by SNK on the same date. Everything in the Neo Geo CD version is identical to the MVS and AES versions, with the exception of replacing FM chiptune background music with arranged versions, plus a few exclusive modes. This is also the only title in the series to have a Neo-Geo CD port released outside Japan.

Outside of SNK's platforms, it was ported to the Sega Saturn. This port was reprogrammed by ADK and published by SNK exclusively in Japan on August 9, 1996. This port has the traditional Arcade mode, the VS. mode, and a CPU VS. mode, and uses the same arranged background music as the Neo-Geo CD port. It also includes some official artworks from all four World Heroes titles and is the only version of the game where Zeus is a selectable character.

On October 18, 2007, SNK Playmore added it along with its predecessors to the arcade game compilation  in Japan for the PlayStation 2.  It was later published in North America on March 11, 2008, and on November 7, 2008, both titled as World Heroes Anthology.  This compilation was reprinted as part of a series of best-sellers subtitled "The Best" in Japan on June 18, 2009.

Reception 

In Japan, Game Machine listed World Heroes Perfect on their July 1, 1995 issue as being the second most-successful arcade game of the month. According to Famitsu, both the AES and Neo Geo CD versions sold over 6,044 and 28,766 copies in their first week on the market respectively.

Reviewing the Neo Geo home version, GamePro stated that it is "almost perfect." While expressing some disappointment that it was only an upgrade of the previous installment, they praised the game for adding new special moves and fixing most of the problems with World Heroes 2 Jet. They concluded that "World Heroes Perfect almost lives up to its title." GamePro later awarded it Best Neo-Geo Game of 1995. Electronic Gaming Monthly scored it an 8.5 out of 10, citing the improved audio, graphics, and playability over previous games in the series, as well as the new moves that they said add considerable depth to the game. Ed Semrad and Al Manuel both said it was by far the best game in the World Heroes series to date. They later stated that, while "not quite perfect, this game is still good." Next Generation reviewed the Neo-Geo version of the game, rating it two stars out of five, and stated that "World Heroes Perfect is best left for fighting game enthusiasts and those gamers without any other fighting games in their current library."

Retrospective reviews 

World Heroes Perfect has been met with a more mixed outlook from reviewers in recent years.

Notes

References

External links 
 
 World Heroes Perfect at GameFAQs
 World Heroes Perfect at Giant Bomb
 World Heroes Perfect at Killer List of Videogames
 World Heroes Perfect at MobyGames

1995 video games
ACA Neo Geo games
ADK (company) games
Arcade video games
D4 Enterprise games
Fighting games
2D fighting games
Multiplayer and single-player video games
Neo Geo games
Neo Geo CD games
Nintendo Switch games
PlayStation Network games
PlayStation 4 games
Sega Saturn games
SNK games
Video games scored by Hideki Yamamoto
Video games scored by Hiroaki Kujirai
Video games scored by Hiroaki Shimizu
Video games scored by Keiichiro Segawa
Video games scored by Takao Oshima
Video games scored by Takeshi Muramatsu
Video games scored by Yuka Watanabe
Video games set in Egypt
Video games set in Japan
Video games set in London
Video games set in Romania
Video games set in prehistory
Virtual Console games
Windows games
Xbox One games
Video games developed in Japan
Hamster Corporation games